The discography of American recording artist CeeLo Green consists of six studio albums, one compilation album, thirty-nine singles and twenty-five music videos.

Albums

Studio albums

Compilation albums

Singles

As lead artist

As featured artist

Other charted songs

Guest appearances

Production discography

1998
Goodie Mob – Still Standing
08. "Ghetto-ology"

1999
Goodie Mob – World Party
05. "The Dip"

2001
Backbone – Concrete Law
03. "Like This"

2002
CeeLo Green – Cee-Lo Green and His Perfect Imperfections
all tracks

2005
The Pussycat Dolls – PCD
01. "Don't Cha"

2006
Amerie – Because I Love It
05. "Take Control"
Kelis – Kelis Was Here
13. "Lil Star"

2009
Nat King Cole – Re:Generations
01. "Lush Life"

2015
Zac Brown Band – Jekyll + Hyde
10. "One Day"

2021
Tinashe – 333
1. "Let Go"

Music videos

As lead artist

As featured artist

See also
Gnarls Barkley discography
Goodie Mob discography

Notes

References

External links
 Official website
 CeeLo Green at AllMusic
 
 

Discographies of American artists
Pop music discographies
Rhythm and blues discographies
Hip hop discographies